This is a list of monuments in St. Paul's Bay, Malta, which are listed on the National Inventory of the Cultural Property of the Maltese Islands.

List 

|}

References

Saint Paul's Bay
St. Paul's Bay
Buildings and structures in St. Paul's Bay